The Pakistan cricket team toured England in May 2019 to play five One Day Internationals (ODIs) and one Twenty20 International (T20I) match ahead of the 2019 Cricket World Cup. The fixtures were part of both teams' preparation for the tournament. Three matches were played against English county sides as part of the tour, with 50-over matches played against Kent and Northants, and a Twenty20 match played against Leicestershire.

In addition to the provisional World Cup squad, Jofra Archer and Chris Jordan were named in England's squads for this series and the preceding ODI against Ireland, and were in contention for a place in the World Cup side depending on their performances. England finalised their fifteen-man World Cup squad following the conclusion of the matches against Pakistan. Mohammad Amir and Asif Ali were omitted from Pakistan's fifteen-man preliminary squad for the World Cup, but were included for this series as reserves.

England won the one-off T20I match by seven wickets. In the third ODI, Eoin Morgan played in his 198th match to become the most-capped player in ODIs for England, going past Paul Collingwood's total of 197 matches for the team. However, Morgan was suspended for the next ODI, following a slow over-rate in the third match. Jos Buttler was named as England's captain for the fourth ODI in Morgan's absence. England won the ODI series 4–0, after the first match was washed out.

England's series aggregate of 1,424 runs was the most for any team in an ODI series where they played a maximum of four innings. This surpassed India's total of 1,275 runs in their home series against Sri Lanka in December 2009.

Squads

Ahead of the tour, Shadab Khan was ruled out of Pakistan's squad with a virus, with Yasir Shah named as his replacement. Shoaib Malik missed Pakistan's first two matches against England due to a personal issue. The Pakistan Cricket Board (PCB) confirmed that he was available for selection for the second ODI match. Mohammad Hafeez was also unavailable for the one-off T20I and the first two ODIs, after injuring his hand.

Sam Billings was ruled out of England's T20I squad after he dislocated his shoulder, and was replaced by Ben Foakes. Alex Hales was dropped from England's squads, following a 21-day ban for using recreational drugs and was replaced by James Vince. Jason Roy and Mark Wood were also withdrawn from the T20I squad prior to the series and were replaced by Ben Duckett and Dawid Malan. Malan then picked up a groin injury in the ODI against Ireland and was replaced by Phil Salt.

Tour matches

One-day match: Kent vs Pakistan

One-day match: Northamptonshire vs Pakistan

Twenty-over match: Leicestershire vs Pakistan

T20I match

Only T20I

ODI series

1st ODI

2nd ODI

3rd ODI

4th ODI

5th ODI

Notes

References

External links
 Series home at ESPN Cricinfo

2019 in English cricket
2019 in Pakistani cricket
International cricket competitions in 2019
Pakistani cricket tours of England